Murray Alan Wing (born October 14, 1950) is a Canadian retired professional ice hockey defenceman who played in one game in the National Hockey League with the Detroit Red Wings during the 1973–74 season, on April 7, 1974 against the Chicago Black Hawks. The rest of his career, which lasted from 1971 to 1977, was spent in the minor leagues.

Career statistics

Regular season and playoffs

See also
 List of players who played only one game in the NHL

External links
 

1950 births
Living people
Boston Braves (AHL) players
Boston Bruins draft picks
Canadian expatriate ice hockey players in England
Canadian expatriate ice hockey players in the United States
Canadian ice hockey defencemen
Detroit Red Wings players
Ice hockey people from Ontario
London Lions (ice hockey) players
North Dakota Fighting Hawks men's ice hockey players
Oklahoma City Blazers (1965–1977) players
Ontario Hockey Association Senior A League (1890–1979) players
San Diego Gulls (WHL) players
Sportspeople from Thunder Bay